Bramley-Moore Dock is a semi-reclaimed dock on the River Mersey in Liverpool, England, and part of the Port of Liverpool. The dock is located in the northern dock system in Liverpool's Vauxhall area, and is connected to Sandon Half Tide Dock to the north and Nelson Dock to the south. Jesse Hartley was the architect, and the dock opened in 1848.

Everton FC's new home ground, Everton Stadium, is currently under construction on the dock. The Club received planning approval for a 52,888 capacity stadium which is set to be opened in time for the start of the 2024/25 football season.  The project was cited as one of the reasons for the revocation of Liverpool's World Heritage Site status as the Liverpool Maritime Mercantile City, with the World Heritage Committee stating that the project was one of the developments which had resulted in a "serious deterioration" of the historic site.

History
The dock was opened on 4 August 1848, as part of Jesse Hartley's major northern expansion scheme of that year, and was named after and opened by John Bramley-Moore, chairman of the dock committee at the time. When built, Bramley-Moore Dock was the most northerly part of the dock system. At the time, access to the River Mersey was from the south, through the new Nelson and Salisbury Docks, which were all commissioned simultaneously. When built, Bramley-Moore Dock was used for the largest steamships of the era.

In 1851, further docks were opened to the north. These included Wellington Half Tide Dock, which gave a second access point for Bramley-Moore into the Mersey. The berthing of the larger ships was moved to the new Sandon Dock and Huskisson Dock within a few years of opening because of the ease of access to the river these docks offered. Around 1900, the Wellington Dock and the adjoining Sandon Dock were realigned, with the half tide dock separated as Sandon Half Tide Dock, as it remains today.

Although a mixed-use dock, with one of the original transit, sheds still in place, Bramley-Moore did extensive coal trade. The coal handling included both coal for export and bunker coal for steamships in the port, transported from the South Lancashire Coalfield. A high-level railway opened in 1857 to transport coal directly to the north quay. The high-level railway was connected by viaduct to the adjacent Lancashire and Yorkshire Railway line. The high-level railway was operational from 1856 to 1966.

After the decline in coal-fired steamships, the dock continued to export coal. Following the demise of coal mining in South Lancashire, and most of the UK, the export market for coal dissolved with the dock ceasing coal exports in 1988.

Bramley-Moore Dock is the location of one of Liverpool's brick-built hydraulic accumulator towers. The Grade II listed tower is in severe disrepair with Everton's plans for a new stadium including the commitment to invest in heritage and repair and restore the tower for public use. The tower provided hydraulic power to dock gates and lifting equipment but is no longer active.

Future of the dock 

In 2007, the Peel Group, owners of the Mersey Docks and Harbour Company, unveiled the £5.5 billion Liverpool Waters regeneration programme. Bramley-Moore Dock is encompassed in the  site.

Bramley-Moore Dock is the most northern of the docks within the former Liverpool Maritime Mercantile City World Heritage Site and the planned Liverpool Waters and the most southerly of the working docks. The hydraulic tower and dock retaining walls are Grade II listed buildings. Bramley-Moore Dock may have been listed as World Heritage Site but sits behind locked gates, semi-derelict with no access to the public, its heritage assets are decaying and is next door to a waste water treatment plant.

On 23 March 2017 it was announced that an agreement was reached between Liverpool City Council, Everton F.C. and Peel Holdings to acquire the dock for a new football stadium. A planning application was submitted on 23 December 2019,
 with approval granted by the city council on 23 February 2021.

On 23 February 2021 Everton Football Club were given planning permission to develop a 52,888 capacity stadium at Bramley-Moore Dock. The planning committee voted unanimously in favour of the plans and spoke passionately about how the public benefits would far outweigh any heritage impact on the site.

Everton's plans would deliver a £1.3bn boost to the economy, create more than 15,000 jobs, attract more than 1.4m visitors and act as a catalyst for £650m of accelerated regeneration.

At the planning meeting Everton also committed to investing up to £55m to repair, preserve, restore and open up Bramley-Moore Dock's heritage assets.

In July 2021, the developments on the dock were stated as reasons for the revocation of Liverpool's World Heritage site status.

On 10th August 2021, ground was broken on the project.

References

Sources

Further reading
Bramley-Moore, John (1846) Report of the speech of J. Bramley-Moore ... on the subject of dock extension addressed to the Liverpool Town Council ... the 19th of January, 1846. Liverpool: Council of the Borough of Liverpool

External links

 Port of Liverpool Official Website 
 North Liverpool Docks diagram
 Map of the location
 Bramley-Moore Dock aerial photo
 1851 map of North Liverpool Docks 
 1881 map of North Liverpool
 Bramley Moore Dock image gallery

Grade II listed buildings in Liverpool
Liverpool docks